John Henry Burton (13 August 1875 – 13 May 1949) was an English footballer who played for Derby County, Tottenham Hotspur, Preston North End and West Ham United.

Career
Born in Derby, Burton started his career with the local clubs before moving to Chatham Town. When Chatham where removed from the Southern League he quit the club and joined Tottenham Hotspur during the 1900–01 season. Burton made his debut in the second half of the season in the Southern League away game against Gravesend United which Tottenham lost 2–1. After five season with Tottenham he left the club for Preston North End and finished his career at West Ham United.

His brother Oliver Burton also played for Tottenham.

References

1875 births
1949 deaths
Derby County F.C. players
Chatham Town F.C. players
Tottenham Hotspur F.C. players
Preston North End F.C. players
West Ham United F.C. players
English footballers